Dr. Georg Werthner (born April 7, 1956, in Linz) is a decathlete from Austria, who was the first athlete to finish four Olympic decathlons. In the 1988 Olympics, Daley Thompson crossed the finish-line a little more than 18 seconds after him to become the second athlete to do this.

Werthner was the Austrian national champion in the decathlon 8 times (1975, 1977, 1979, 1980, 1982, 1984, 1986, and 1988), along with being individual event champion in long jump (1977), triple jump (1977, 1979, 1980, and 1982), javelin throw (1979-1981, 1983, 1984, and 1988).  Running with his ULC Linz club, he was a member of their 1980 and 1981 winning 4x100 metres relay team, and their 1980 4x400 metres relay team.  He is now part of their hall of fame, still holding club records for high jump, pole vault, javelin throw, pentathlon and decathlon.  He switched to the Zehnkampf-Union decathlon club in 1984.

Werthner is still active in Masters athletics and has won numerous World Masters Athletics Championships.

Achievements

References

External links
Profile

1956 births
Living people
Austrian decathletes
Austrian male athletes
Athletes (track and field) at the 1976 Summer Olympics
Athletes (track and field) at the 1980 Summer Olympics
Athletes (track and field) at the 1984 Summer Olympics
Athletes (track and field) at the 1988 Summer Olympics
Olympic athletes of Austria
Universiade medalists in athletics (track and field)
Sportspeople from Linz
Universiade bronze medalists for Austria
Medalists at the 1981 Summer Universiade
Medalists at the 1983 Summer Universiade